The 1876 United States presidential election in Iowa took place on November 7, 1876, as part of the 1876 United States presidential election. Voters chose 11 representatives, or electors, to the Electoral College, who voted for president and vice president.

Iowa was won by Rutherford B. Hayes, the governor of Ohio (R-Ohio), running with Representative William A. Wheeler, with 58.50% of the vote, against Samuel J. Tilden, the former governor of New York (D–New York), running with Thomas A. Hendricks, the governor of Indiana and future vice president, with 38.28% of the popular vote.

The Greenback Party chose industrialist Peter Cooper and former representative Samuel Fenton Cary, received 3.22% of the vote. Iowa gave the Greenbacks both their largest number of total votes and percentage and Iowa would later be the last bastion of the congressional Greenbacks who held a House seat until 1889.

Results

See also
 United States presidential elections in Iowa

References

Iowa
1876
1876 Iowa elections